Nagorsky (masculine), Nagorskaya (feminine), or Nagorskoye (neuter) is the name of several rural localities in Russia:
Nagorskoye, Kirov Oblast, a selo in Talitsky Rural Okrug of Falyonsky District of Kirov Oblast
Nagorskoye, Kostroma Oblast, a village in Sudayskoye Settlement of Chukhlomsky District of Kostroma Oblast
Nagorskoye, Kurgan Oblast, a selo in Nagorsky Selsoviet of Pritobolny District of Kurgan Oblast
Nagorskoye, Tver Oblast, a village in Kalyazinsky District of Tver Oblast
Nagorskoye, Vologda Oblast, a village in Raboche-Krestyansky Selsoviet of Vologodsky District of Vologda Oblast
Nagorskoye, Yaroslavl Oblast, a village in Osetsky Rural Okrug of Lyubimsky District of Yaroslavl Oblast
Nagorskaya, a village in Rostovsky Selsoviet of Ustyansky District of Arkhangelsk Oblast